Paria is a Norwegian silent film from 1916. The film was directed by Peter Lykke-Seest, who also wrote the script. It is believed to have been the first film produced by the company Christiania Film Co. A/S. For unknown reasons, the film was never examined by the censorship committee and was therefore never shown in public. The film is considered lost.

Cast
 Robert Sperati as Carsten, a shipowner
 Randi Haanshus as Alice, Carsten's daughter
 Reidar Kaas as Berner, a doctor
 Henning Eriksen as Riego
 Hildur Øverland as Zaima

References

External links
 Paria at Filmfront

1916 films
Norwegian drama films
Norwegian black-and-white films
Norwegian silent films
1916 drama films
Lost Norwegian films
1916 lost films
Lost drama films
Silent drama films